(born May 30, 1996), better known by his ring name , is a Japanese professional wrestler currently signed to Dragon Gate, where he is the current Open the Dream Gate Champion in his second reign. He has also wrestled in promotions such as International Wrestling Revolution Group, where he won the Rey del Ring tournament in 2020, as well as Lucha Libre AAA Worldwide, Toryumon Mexico, All Japan Pro Wrestling, and Major League Wrestling.

Professional wrestling career

Championships and accomplishments
Dragon Gate
Open the Dream Gate Championship (2 times, current)
Open the Twin Gate Championship (1 time) - with Diamante
Open the Triangle Gate Championship (2 times) - with Kota Minoura and Jason Lee (1) and Kai and Ishin (1)
Rookie Ranking Tournament (2019)
Rookie of the Year (2018)
International Wrestling Revolution Group
Rey del Ring (2020)
Major League Wrestling
MLW Middleweight Championship (1 time)
Pro Wrestling Illustrated
Ranked No. 58 of the top 500 singles wrestlers in the PWI 500 in 2021

References

1996 births
Living people
Masked wrestlers
Japanese male professional wrestlers
Sportspeople from Gifu Prefecture
Japanese expatriate sportspeople in Mexico
21st-century professional wrestlers
Open the Dream Gate Champions
Open the Twin Gate Champions
Open the Triangle Gate Champions
MLW World Middleweight Champions